Leisure Lake is an unincorporated community and census-designated place (CDP) in Grundy County, Missouri, United States. As of the 2020 census, the population was 166.

It is located in western Grundy County and consists of a residential community set round a reservoir named Leisure Lake. Missouri Route 146 forms the eastern and northern edge of the CDP and leads southeast  to Trenton, the Grundy County seat.

Demographics

References

Census-designated places in Grundy County, Missouri
Census-designated places in Missouri